Deh-e Pahlavan (also Romanized as Deh-e Pahlavān; also known as Pahlavān) is a village in Jahanabad Rural District, in the Central District of Hirmand County, Sistan and Baluchestan Province, Iran. At the 2006 census, its population was 374, in 79 families.

References 

Populated places in Hirmand County